Hope and Despair is the debut solo album by Scottish musician Edwyn Collins. It was released in 1989.

Track listing
All tracks composed by Edwyn Collins; except where indicated
"Coffee Table Song" – 4:51
"50 Shades of Blue" – 3:55
"You're Better Than You Know" – 4:12
"Pushing It to the Back of My Mind" – 3:47
"If Ever You're Ready" – 4:21
"Darling, They Want It All" – 3:42
"The Wheels of Love" – 4:54
"The Beginning of the End" – 3:57
"The Measure of a Man" (Dennis Bovell) – 3:38
"Testing Time" – 3:51
"Let Me Put My Arms Around You" – 4:06
"The Wide Eyed Child in Me" – 2:51
"Ghost of a Chance" – 4:08
"Hope and Despair" – 3:22

Personnel
Edwyn Collins – guitar, vocals, backing vocals
Dennis Bovell – bass
David Ruffy – drums
Bernie Clarke – Hammond organ, piano, synthesizer, Wurlitzer
Roddy Frame- guitar, backing vocals
Steven Skinner - guitar
Bruce Dern - steel guitar on "Pushing It to the Back of My Mind" and "The Wide Eyed Child in Me"
Alex Grey - Hammond organ on "50 Shades of Blue"
Tom Dokoupil - synthesizer on "Pushing It to the Back of My Mind"; string arrangement on "You're Better Than You Know"

References

1989 debut albums
Edwyn Collins albums
Setanta Records albums